Anderson Luiz Gomes Ribeiro (born 18 April 1982), known as Anderson Luiz, is a Brazilian footballer who played as a central defender.

Club career
Born in Rio de Janeiro, Anderson Luiz spent most of his career in lower divisions of Brazil. He was signed by Madureira in December 2005 for 2006 Campeonato Carioca, finished as the runner-up. On 2 April 2006 he was signed by Duque de Caxias for the remain matches of Campeonato Carioca second division. The team finished as the final 8. On 3 July 2006 he was signed by Vasco in 1-year contract, but loaned Anderson back to Duque de Caxias for a promotion playoffs. (eventually no team promoted) In December 2006 he returned to Vasco but only played twice. A friendly match and a 2007 Copa do Brasil match. Anderson then returned to Duque de Caxias and finished fifth in Campeonato Carioca second division and promoted. However, he left for Clube Atlético Juventus and played in 2008 Copa do Brasil and 2008 Campeonato Paulista. In July, he moved back to Rio for Bangu, winning 2008 second division of the state. In January 2009 he was signed by Votoraty, winning 2009 Campeonato Paulista Série A3 and 2009 Copa Paulista de Futebol. The team finished as the ninth of 2010 Campeonato Paulista Série A2. He then joined Treze of 2010 Campeonato Brasileiro Série D in June. The team finished as the losing side of Série D second stage and as losing semi-finalists of 2010 Campeonato do Nordeste. He renewed his contract in January 2011 until the end of 2011 Campeonato Paraibano.

References

External links 
 CBF 
 Futpedia 
 Fla Estatistica 
 Net Vasco Profile 
 

1982 births
Living people
Footballers from Rio de Janeiro (city)
Brazilian footballers
Association football defenders
Campeonato Brasileiro Série A players
Campeonato Brasileiro Série B players
Campeonato Brasileiro Série C players
CR Flamengo footballers
Brasiliense Futebol Clube players
Associação Portuguesa de Desportos players
Madureira Esporte Clube players
Duque de Caxias Futebol Clube players
CR Vasco da Gama players
Clube Atlético Juventus players
Bangu Atlético Clube players
Votoraty Futebol Clube players
Treze Futebol Clube players
Luverdense Esporte Clube players
Anápolis Futebol Clube players
Boavista Sport Club players